Iulian Dăniță (born 18 October 1975) is a Romanian former football player.

References

External links
 
 
 

1975 births
People from Buzău
Living people
Romanian footballers
Liga II players
FC Gloria Buzău players
FCM Dunărea Galați players
FC Drobeta-Turnu Severin players
AFC Dacia Unirea Brăila players
CS Otopeni players
SV Sandhausen players
Ukrainian Premier League players
SC Tavriya Simferopol players
FC Metalist Kharkiv players
Russian Premier League players
FC Chernomorets Novorossiysk players
Romanian expatriate footballers
Expatriate footballers in Germany
Expatriate footballers in Ukraine
Romanian expatriate sportspeople in Ukraine
Expatriate footballers in Russia
Association football defenders